The Silver Bear for Best Actor was an award presented at the Berlin International Film Festival from 1956 to 2020. It was given to an actor who has delivered an outstanding performance and was chosen by the International Jury from the films in the Competition slate at the festival. Beginning with the 71st Berlin International Film Festival, the award was replaced with the gender-neutral categories, Silver Bear for Best Leading Performance and Silver Bear for Best Supporting Performance.

At the 6th Berlin International Film Festival held in 1956, Burt Lancaster was the first winner of this award for his performance in Trapeze, and Elio Germano was the last winner in this category, for his role in Hidden Away at the 70th Berlin International Film Festival in 2020.

History
The award was first presented in 1956 and can be for lead or supporting roles. The prize was not awarded on three occasions (1969, 1973, and 1974). In 1970, no awards were given as the festival was called off mid-way due to the controversy over the official selection film, o.k. by Michael Verhoeven, which led to the resignation of the international jury. In 2011, the entire male cast of A Separation received the award. Sidney Poitier, Jean Gabin, Fernando Fernán Gómez, and Denzel Washington have won the most awards in this category, each winning twice. 

The last of this award was given out in 2020, after which it was replaced with a gender-neutral categories, Best Leading Performance and Best Supporting Performance the following year.

Winners

Multiple winners 

The following individuals have received multiple Best Actor awards:

See also
 Cannes Film Festival Award for Best Actor
 Volpi Cup for Best Actor

Notes

A: The entire male and female cast of A Separation (جدایی نادر از سیمین) was recipient of this award.

References

External links 

 Berlinale website

Actor
 
Awards disestablished in 2020
Awards established in 1956
Awards for male actors
Film awards for lead actor
Film awards for supporting actor
Silver Bear, Best Actor